William (Bill) P. McCormick (born August 18, 1939, in Providence, Rhode Island) is an American businessman and diplomat. He served as the United States ambassador to New Zealand and Samoa from October 21, 2005, until January 10, 2009. He is married and has six children.

McCormick attended Roger Williams University and Boston University while serving in the United States Army Reserve Military Police until he was honorably discharged in 1963. He then moved to northern California and worked in the brokerage office of Connecticut General Life Insurance Companyin San Francisco until 1965. It was at this time that he became a partner in the Refectory Steak House Restaurant chain. By the early 1970s McCormick had moved further north to Portland, Oregon, and sold his interest in the Refectory Restaurants.

In 1971, he purchased the restaurant Jake's Famous Crawfish and within the year had partnered with Doug Schmick. While growing the restaurant company, he attended the Harvard Business School, Executive Management Program, in 1979. At that time, there were 60 McCormick & Schmick's Seafood Restaurants in 22 states employing over 8,000 people. McCormick and Schmick's is owned by Landry's, Inc.

Throughout his business career McCormick's civic and charitable involvement was far-reaching. For example, he has provided thousands of pounds of food for the Pasadena, California, food bank and 11,000 books for disadvantaged children in Los Angeles County. He began the Shamrock Run twenty-seven years ago for the benefit of many service organizations in Portland, Oregon. McCormick was awarded the Secretary's Award by the United States Department of Veterans Affairs for his contributions to, and recognition of, the nation's veterans. Each year McCormick & Schmick Seafood Restaurants provides over 17,000 complimentary meals to veterans visiting any McCormick & Schmick Restaurant on Veterans Day.

As co-chair of the Portland Opera Foundation, he was successful in raising $24 million to help sustain that organization in the future. Under President George W. Bush, McCormick served on the President's Committee of the Arts & Humanities, whose Honorary chairman is First Lady of the United States, then Laura Bush.

References

1939 births
Living people
Ambassadors of the United States to New Zealand
American restaurateurs
Boston University alumni
Businesspeople from Oregon
Harvard Business School alumni
Businesspeople from Providence, Rhode Island
Roger Williams University alumni
United States Army soldiers
Ambassadors of the United States to Samoa
20th-century American businesspeople
21st-century American businesspeople
21st-century American diplomats